(translation: Ginza Kankan Girl) is a 1949 black and white Japanese film directed by Koji Shima.

Cast
 Shizuko Kasagi
 Hideko Takamine

External links
 

Films directed by Koji Shima
1949 films
Shintoho films
Japanese comedy films
1949 comedy films
Japanese black-and-white films
Films scored by Ryōichi Hattori